Asterella elegans, the elegant asterella, is a species of liverworts in the family of Aytoniaceae. It is found in Texas, Mexico, Guatemala and Cuba.

References

External links 
 

Aytoniaceae
Plants described in 1874
Bryophyta of North America
Flora of Cuba
Flora of Guatemala
Flora of Mexico
Flora of Texas
Flora without expected TNC conservation status